Craig Tucker is a fictional character in the adult animated television series South Park. One of the main characters' fourth-grade classmates, he debuted in the season one episode "Mr. Hankey, the Christmas Poo" singing "We Wish You a Merry Christmas" with the rest of the third-grade class. His speaking debut was in "Rainforest Shmainforest". A pragmatist, Craig commonly strays from the plans of the main characters in favor of more practical, realistic approaches and solutions to main issues.

Since the season 19 episode "Tweek x Craig", Craig has been involved in a relationship with fellow fourth-grade student Tweek Tweak. Seemingly forced by the other townspeople at first, their relationship has been shown to evolve throughout South Park as a genuine sincere relationship, and have been shown to identify as gay.

Appearance 
Craig is commonly seen wearing a blue chullo hat. He is characterized by this and his deep, nasal, monotone voice. In some scenes, including during a head lice check in "Lice Capades", Craig is seen with no hat and black hair. He is also seen as a stereotypical metrosexual in "South Park is Gay!", and an anime-styled ninja wielding a katana in "Good Times with Weapons".

Biography

Inception 
In the beginning of South Park, Craig was said to be the most violent and strongest student in the third-grade class (excluding Cartman). Cartman once claimed that Craig was the "biggest troublemaker in [their] class", and parents of his classmates have cited him as a "bad influence". In a running gag during the show's earlier seasons, establishing shots of Mr. Mackey's office would feature Craig waiting outside, yet his activities were never seen. In the first several seasons, Craig has a habit of giving people the finger, a trait the show's official website attributes to his learning the behavior from his family, all of whom frequently use the gesture as well, most notably in the third season episode, "Tweek vs. Craig", in which his entire family take turns flipping each other off at the dinner table. This trait was used less throughout the show's runtime, and was last seen in the episode "Fun with Veal". Along with the rest of the characters, Craig moved to the fourth grade in "Fourth Grade".

Rivalry with the main characters 
Craig dislikes the four main characters (Stan Marsh, Kyle Broflovski, Kenny McCormick and Eric Cartman) and rivals them in several episodes. Craig is a pragmatist and has no wish to become involved in any extraordinary adventures the other main characters on the show customarily experience. In the season 12 (2008) episodes "Pandemic" and "Pandemic 2: The Startling", Craig repeatedly castigates the main characters' propensity for engaging in schemes that catastrophically backfire upon them. He also complains that they just seem to blindly accept that these things happen to them. He decides that he will no longer participate in such schemes, and walks away from the one in which they find themselves in the latter episode. However, by taking this action he fulfills an ancient prophecy, by stepping on a mysterious platform that allows him to defeat the giant guinea pig monster responsible for that story line's conflict. He concludes from this that just because there are things in life that cannot be controlled does not mean that one should accept them without protest.

"Craig's gang" 
Despite his dislike of the main characters, particularly Cartman, he is often depicted as one of the boys who repeatedly join Cartman in his many schemes, at times serving as a right-hand man. According to the creators of South Park, Craig's best friend is his classmate Tolkien Black. He is also close friends with Clyde Donovan and Jimmy Valmer, who are members of Craig's clique known as "Craig's gang".

Members of "Craig's gang" include:
Craig Tucker
 Tolkien Black
 Clyde Donovan
 Jimmy Valmer
 Tweek Tweak (Craig's boyfriend)
 Jason White (former)
 Butters Stotch (former)

Homosexuality and relationship with Tweek Tweak 
In the Season 19 episode "Tweek x Craig", female students of Asian backgrounds started drawing homoerotic "yaoi" images of Craig and his classmate Tweek Tweak, depicting them as lovers (an acknowledgement of a trend popular among real-life South Park fans of creating fanart depicting the pair as a couple, several examples of which are featured in the episode). Immediately, the two try to repudiate the rumors about them prompted by this. They eventually resolve to stage a public "break-up" to end the rumors. Though Tweek fears he cannot do this believably, Craig encourages him that he indeed can. However, Tweek goes too far by claiming that Craig is a manipulative cheater, which has the effect of ruining Craig's reputation with girls. Tweek later reveals that Craig's encouragement gave him the confidence to believe in himself. Following the father-to-son talk between him and his father about how "you can't fight being gay", the two boys have been in a relationship. In later episodes, such as the season 21 episode "Put It Down" and the video game The Fractured But Whole, they are shown to have become sincere romantic partners and identify as gay.

Reception 
On a 2022 list of the 20 best South Park characters, We Got This Covered ranked Craig #9. On another 2022 top 25 list, Looper ranked Craig #13. CBR pointed out that "Craig has gradually become more of a supporting player to the boys, but he’s also become a lot more popular after the (romance) between him and Tweek", and ranked him on #5 of "10 Characters who Got Way More Popular Since the Beginning". Michael John-Day of WhatCulture ranked Craig as the 2nd most "underrated" South Park character in 2020.

Appearances in other media 
He plays the role of a Rogue in South Park: The Stick of Truth and plays the role of Super Craig in South Park: The Fractured but Whole (a parody of Superman from DC Comics).

References 

South Park characters
Fictional gay males
LGBT characters in animation
Animated human characters
American male characters in television
Child characters in animated television series
Child characters in animated films
Comedy film characters
Fictional characters from Colorado
Fictional elementary school students
Television characters introduced in 1997
Animated characters introduced in 1997
Fictional LGBT characters in television
LGBT characters in animated television series